Speeding is the second studio album by Australian rap artist Allday. It was released on 21 April 2017 and peaked at number 6 on the ARIA Charts. The album spawned three singles: "Sides", "Raceway", and "In Motion".

In an interview with The AU Review Allday said "I would consider Speeding to be more of a snapshot of a period in my life. I felt like making something that felt like winter and was really personal." adding "I don't think my next album will sound much like Speeding. I think I've got it out of my system a little bit."

Critical reception
John Papadopoulos from The Music said "While many Australian rappers seem content to make music for lounging on Bondi Beach... Allday's music is in the here and now. If you close your eyes, you might even be led to think this was Tory Lanez or (maybe too optimistically) Travis Scott, only with strange references to a place called Melbourne. This isn't to say that Allday's music is derivative; only that it's strikingly contemporary enough to be compared with those artists."

Track listing

Charts

Release history

References

Allday albums
2017 albums